Jensen House or variations may refer to:

in the United States

Cornelius Jensen Ranch, Rubidoux, California, listed on the National Register of Historic Places (NRHP)
Jensen Ranch (Selma, California)
Chris Jensen Round Barn, Lena, Illinois, NRHP-listed  
Jens Jensen Summer House and Studio, Highland Park, Illinois, NRHP-listed, a home of Jens Jensen (landscape architect)
Arendt Jensen House, Gardnerville, Nevada, listed on the NRHP in Douglas County
Arendt Jensen Jr. House, Gardnerville, Nevada, listed on the NRHP in Douglas County
Governor Leslie Jensen House, Hot Springs, South Dakota, NRHP-listed
James L. Jensen House, Houston, Texas, NRHP-listed in Harris County
Hans C. Jensen House, Ephraim, Utah, NRHP-listed in Sanpete County
Rasmus Jensen House, Ephraim, Utah, NRHP-listed in Sanpete County
Lars and Agnes Jensen House, Orem, Utah, NRHP-listed
Frederick C. Jensen House, Mount Pleasant, Utah, NRHP-listed in Sanpete County
Joseph F. and Isabelle Jensen House, Sandy, Utah, NRHP-listed in Salt Lake County
James B. and Ellen May Cushing Jensen House, Sandy, Utah, NRHP-listed in Salt Lake County
Michael Jensen House, Sandy, Utah, NRHP-listed in Salt Lake County
Jensen-Clark House, Sandy, Utah, NRHP-listed in Salt Lake County 
Allsop-Jensen House, Sandy, Utah, NRHP-listed in Salt Lake County
Amos and Ida Jensen House, Sandy, Utah, NRHP-listed in Salt Lake County
Jensen-Jensen House, Sandy, Utah, NRHP-listed in Salt Lake County
Tollef Jensen House, Galesville, Wisconsin, NRHP-listed in Trempealeau County
J. L. Jensen House, Stevens Point, Wisconsin, NRHP-listed in Portage County
Matt and Lena Jensen House, Waupaca, Wisconsin, NRHP-listed in Waupaca County
Jensen Ranch (Boulder, Wyoming), NRHP-listed in Sublette County

See also
Jensen Ranch (disambiguation)